Detroit Harbor is an unincorporated community located in the Town of Washington Island on Washington Island in Door County, Wisconsin. The Washington Island Ferry runs scheduled passenger service to Northport from Detroit Harbor. Detroit Harbor is also home to a United States Post Office and Coast Guard Station Washington Island. A bay named Detroit Harbor is adjacent to the community.

References

Unincorporated communities in Wisconsin
Unincorporated communities in Door County, Wisconsin
Piers in Wisconsin